Roger Schmidt may refer to:

 Roger Schmidt (academic) (1931–2018), American theologian and academic
 Roger Schmidt (footballer) (born 1967), German football manager and former player